The Brasstown Wilderness was designated in 1986 and currently consists of . The Wilderness is located within the borders of the Chattahoochee National Forest in Union County and Towns County, Georgia. The Wilderness is managed by the United States Forest Service and is part of the National Wilderness Preservation System.

The highest elevation in the Brasstown Wilderness is the  peak of Brasstown Bald, which is also the highest point in Georgia. The land that forms the Wilderness drapes across the northern, northeastern, and southwestern flanks of Brasstown Bald.

External links 
Wilderness.net entry for the Brasstown Wilderness
Brasstown Wilderness and Brasstown bald Visitor Center

IUCN Category Ib
Protected areas of the Appalachians
Protected areas of Towns County, Georgia
Protected areas of Union County, Georgia
Wilderness areas of Georgia (U.S. state)
Protected areas established in 1986
Chattahoochee-Oconee National Forest
1986 establishments in Georgia (U.S. state)